A killer is someone or something that kills, such as a murderer or a serial killer. 

Killer may also refer to:

Arts, entertainment, and media

Fictional characters
 Killer (Home and Away), a character from Home and Away
 Killer Kane, the villain of the 1939 Buck Rogers film serial

Films
 Killer! (1969 film), an alternative title for This Man Must Die
 Killer (1991 film), a Telugu film starring Akkineni Nagarjuna
 Killer (1994 film) (a.k.a. Bulletproof Heart), a film starring Anthony LaPaglia and Mimi Rogers, and featuring Peter Boyle
 Killer: A Journal of Murder (film), a 1996 film about serial killer Carl Panzram
 Killer (1998 film), a French/Kazakhstani crime drama

Games 
 Killer (game), a parlor game played with cards and candles
 Killer (pool), a multi-player pocket billiards (pool) game
 Killer, a climbing card game related to tiến lên
 Killer, a variant of the game of darts
 Assassin (game), or Killer, a live-action role-playing game
 Killer sudoku, or samunamupure, a variant of sudoku
 Killer: The Game of Assassination, a live action role-playing game set of rules first published by Steve Jackson Games in 1982

Literature 
 Killer (novel) a novel by Sara Shepard, part of The Pretty Little Liars series
 Killer: A Journal of Murder (novel), a 1970 biographical novel upon which the 1996 film is based

Music

Groups
 Killer (Finnish band), an early 2000s Finnish alternative and experimental rock band
 Killer (Swiss band), a hard rock band
 Killer (Belgian band), a hard rock band

Albums 
 Killer (Alice Cooper album), a 1971 rock album by Alice Cooper
 Killer (video), a music DVD by Die Ärzte released in 1999
 Killer (Tech N9ne album), 2008 rap album by Tech N9ne

Songs 
 "Killer" (Kiss song), 1982
 "Killer" (Adamski song), 1990, featuring Seal as a vocalist
 "Killer" (Fazer song), 2012
 "Killer", a song by Van Der Graaf Generator from H to He, Who Am the Only One, 1970
 "Killer", a song by Boy Kill Boy from Civilian, 2006
 "Killer", a song by The Hoosiers from The Trick to Life, 2007
 "Killer", a song by Dev from The Night The Sun Came Up, 2011
 "Killer", a song by Krokus from Painkiller, 1978
 "Killer", a song by Kali Uchis from Isolation, 2018
 "Killer", a song by Eminem from the deluxe edition of Music to Be Murdered By, 2020

Television
 "Killer" (CSI), an episode from the sixth season of the American television series CSI: Crime Scene Investigation (2006)
 "Killer" (Taggart), the 1983 pilot episode and title of the later renamed Scottish detective TV series Taggart
 Killer (TV series), a 1984 British thriller series which aired on ITV

People 
 Killer (nickname), a list of people known as "Killer" or "The Killer"
 Killer Brooks (born 1947), ring name of American professional wrestler Tim Brooks
 Killer Khan (born 1947), ring name of Japanese professional wrestler Masashi Ozawa
 Daniel Killer (born 1949), former Argentine footballer
 Tobias Killer (born 1993), German footballer
 Bob Konovsky (1934–1982), American National Football League player and professional wrestler known as "Killer Konovsky"
 Killer Kowalski (1926–2008), ring name of Polish-Canadian professional wrestler Władek Kowalski

Science and technology
 Killer (computer), an AT&T public-access UNIX machine involved in Operation Sundevil
 Death receptor 5, a tumor necrosis factor receptor superfamily, member 10b, a human gene, alias KILLER
 Killer application or killer app, a computer program that is so necessary or desirable that it proves the core value of some larger technology
 Killer NIC, a network interface card manufactured by Bigfoot Networks
 Killer yeast, a yeast, such as Saccharomyces cerevisiae, which is able to secrete one of a number of toxic proteins which are lethal to receptive cells

Other uses
 Killer (philately), a term for a heavy stamp cancellation mark
 Killer, Germany, a village in the town of Burladingen, in the Killertal valley

See also
 Kiler, a 1997 Polish film
 
 Killa (disambiguation)
 Killah (disambiguation)
 The Killer (disambiguation)
 Killers (disambiguation)
 The Killers (disambiguation)